The 2020 Faroe Islands Premier League (referred to as Betri deildin menn for sponsorship reasons) was the 78th season of top-tier football in the Faroe Islands, and the 16th under the current format.

KÍ were the defending champions, having won their 18th Faroese title in the previous season. The season was scheduled to start on 8 March and later postponed to 15 March, because of the outbreak of coronavirus in the Faroe Islands. The season started on 9 May 2020 and ended on 7 November 2020. This was decided after there had been no reported case of COVID-19 in the Faroe Islands from 6 April to 18 April. There has been no deaths due to COVID-19 in the Faroe Islands as of 8 November 2020.

The Norwegian TV2 broadcast matches from the first 12 rounds.

Havnar Bóltfelag (HB) won their 24th championship with 69 points. 

Skála were relegated and AB played against B68 Toftir to decide if AB would be relegated or not. The winner of the match won the right to play in the top league in the 2021 season. The match was played on 29 November 2020. AB lost the match 2-3 (1-1 after 90 minutes) after extra time, and was relegated. B68 won promotion to 2021 Faroe Islands Premier League. Andri Benjaminsen, the 20-year-old younger brother of record player of the Faroe Islands national football team Fróði Benjaminsen scored a hat trick.

Teams

Last season, there was no relegation, as three backup teams finished in the top three in 1. deild.

League table

Fixtures and results
Each team plays three times (either twice at home and once away or once at home and twice away) against each other team for a total of 27 matches each.

Rounds 1–18

Rounds 18–27

Top goalscorers

See also
 2020 Faroe Islands Cup
 2020 1. deild
 2020 2. deild

References

Faroe Islands Premier League seasons
1
Faroe
Faroe
Faroe Islands Premier League